Borucice refers to the following places in Poland:

 Borucice, Łódź Voivodeship
 Borucice, Opole Voivodeship